Halima Bashir is the fictitious name of a Sudanese medical doctor, who is the author of Tears of the Desert, a memoir about women's experiences with genocide and war in Darfur. She worked as a doctor in rural Sudan, before being abused at the hands of the National Intelligence and Security Service after reporting truthfully to United Nations officials about an attack by the Janjaweed militia on a nearby school. She has since moved to the United Kingdom, where she claimed asylum.

Life
Halima Bashir, a pseudonym later adopted to protect her, grew up in rural Darfur in Western Sudan. She was the oldest of four children, and did well in school. At the age of eight, she underwent female circumcision. A special meal was held, and she was given money, before being held down in the hut of her grandmother while a razor without anaesthetic was used to cut off any external genitalia.

Her father was supportive when she trained to become a doctor; she completed her training just prior to the start of the genocide and War in Darfur. While she was posted in a clinic, she gave an interview in which she disagreed with the official position of the Sudanese government. In response, she was detained and threatened by the authorities, before being posted to a rural clinic and warned not to speak to western journalists.

At her new clinic, she found herself treating the victims of the Janjaweed militia, including school girls who had been raped en masse. She later explained, "At no stage in my years of study had I been taught how to deal with 8-year-old victims of gang rape in a rural clinic without enough sutures to go around." When two officials from the United Nations came to gather information about the attack, Bashir told them the truth. In response, she was taken by the National Intelligence and Security Service, and was gang raped, cut with knives and burned with cigarettes repeatedly over the course of several days. She was released and returned to her village, where her father arranged for her to be married to her cousin Sharif, who she had only met once before. He had chosen Sharif, because he was viewed as being progressive. The village was attacked shortly afterwards, resulting in the death of her father and the disappearance of her siblings.

Journey overseas and writing
Bashir left Sudan and travelled to the United Kingdom to claim asylum, she had paid a people trafficker with jewellery. While in the UK, she protested the country's lack of action against Sudan, handing a letter personally to Lord David Triesman, the Minister for Africa within the British government. She wrote an autobiography, Tears of the Desert, in collaboration with Damien Lewis, published in 2008.

In her book, she has changed names and places. However, independent verification by The New York Times has demonstrated the facts appear without any exaggeration. The newspaper also campaigned for Bashir to be granted a visa for entry into the United States. In 2010, she was awarded the Anna Politkovskaya Award for speaking out about the Janjaweed's violent attacks on school girls in Darfur.

Notes and references

Living people
21st-century women writers
African women in war
Women memoirists
Sudanese women writers
Wartime sexual violence
Women in 21st-century warfare
Writers about Africa
Zaghawa people
Darfuri writers
Sudanese non-fiction writers
Pseudonymous women writers
21st-century Sudanese writers
Year of birth missing (living people)
Sudanese physicians
21st-century women physicians
Torture victims
Sudanese victims of crime
Sudanese expatriates in the United Kingdom
Refugees in the United Kingdom
Sudanese refugees
21st-century pseudonymous writers
Violence against women in Sudan